"Limimaricola" is a genus of bacteria from the family of Rhodobacteraceae.

References

Rhodobacteraceae
Bacteria genera